The 1991 Columbia Lions football team was an American football team that represented Columbia University during the 1991 NCAA Division I-AA football season. Columbia tied for last in the Ivy League. 

In their third season under head coach Ray Tellier, the Lions compiled a 1–9 record and were outscored 249 to 154. Chuck Dimitrof and Brad Hutton were the team captains.  

The Lions' 1–6 conference record tied for seventh (and worst) in the Ivy League standings. Columbia was outscored 177 to 114 by Ivy opponents. 

Columbia played its homes games at Lawrence A. Wien Stadium in Upper Manhattan, in New York City.

Schedule

References

Columbia
Columbia Lions football seasons
Columbia Lions football